Marcel Mérignargues (17 March 1884 – 14 September 1965) was a French sculptor. His work was part of the art competitions at the 1928 Summer Olympics and the 1932 Summer Olympics.

References

1884 births
1965 deaths
20th-century French sculptors
French male sculptors
Olympic competitors in art competitions
People from Nîmes